Cicciano is a comune (municipality) in the Metropolitan City of Naples in the Italian region Campania, located about 30 km northeast of Naples.

Cicciano borders the following municipalities: Camposano, Comiziano, Nola, Roccarainola, Tufino.

References

Cities and towns in Campania